St. Leonhard station is a Nuremberg U-Bahn station, located on the line U2.

References

Nuremberg U-Bahn stations
Railway stations in Germany opened in 1984
1984 establishments in West Germany